Baji is a 1963 Pakistani musical romance film directed by S. Suleman. The film features Nayyar Sultana, Darpan, Zeba, Agha Talish and Lehri. The film depicts the frustrations of a young widow due to her increasing age.

The film didn't perform well at box office but received appreciable reviews. In 2018, the film was selected to screen at Lok Virsa Museum. It received 5 awards at 1963 Nigar Awards, including Best film. The film topped the British Film Institute's critics' poll of "Top Ten Pakistani Films of all time" in 2002.

Plot 
Farzana a.k.a. 'Fari' commonly known as Baji in her circle of friends is a young widow, lives with some of her servants in a bungalow. Baji lives a lonely life and has no family members living with her. One day, her cousin Nasir comes to meet her and she discovers that he lives nearby with a friend for his work assignment. Nasir then meets Seemi, daughter of Baji's servant. They both fall for each other and decide to marry. Nasir returns home to bring his mother to send his proposal of marriage. When Baji learns of it, he thinks that her mother is coming for her marriage. But when she arrives, she requests her to take Naisr's proposal to Seemi's parents. Baji is shocked to hear it but controls herself and decides to arrange their marriage. After their marriage is settled, Baji's health deteriorates and she is admitted to the hospital. In the hospital, one of Baji's servants Zeenat tells Nasir that he is responsible for Baji's condition because his friendly and caring behaviour towards her weighs on her. He then decides to call off the marriage and refuses to marry Seemi but agrees later when Baji insists upon it. In this way, Nasir and Seemi gets married but Baji dies sitting on the bench in her house's garden.

Cast 
 Nayyar Sultana as Farzana “Fari”, Baji
 Darpan as Nasir
 Zeba as Seemi
 Salma Mumtaz as Seemi's mother
 Bibbo as Naisr's mother
 Lehri as Shahid
 Naina as Zeenat
 Agha Talish
 Zareen Panna
 Emmi Minwala
 Nazar
 Yasmin (cameo appearance)
 Ejaz (cameo appearance)
 Noor Jehan (cameo; appearance in song "Sajjan Lagi Tori")
 Habib (cameo; appearance in song "Sajjan Lagi Tori")
 Sabiha Khanum (cameo; appearance in song "Sajjan Lagi Tori")
 Santosh Kumar (cameo; appearance in song "Sajjan Lagi Tori")
 Waheed Murad (cameo; appearance in song "Sajjan Lagi Tori")
 Sultan Rahi (cameo; appearance in song "Sajjan Lagi Tori")

Soundtrack 
All lyrics of the songs were written by Ahmad Rahi while music was composed by Salim Iqbal.
 Dil Ke Afsanay sung by Noor Jehan
 Chanda Tori Chandani Mein sung by Naseem Begum
 Ab Yahan Koi Nahi sung by Noor Jehan
 Sajjan Lagi Tori Lagan Mun Maa sung by Noor Jehan and Farida Khanum

Awards and nominations

References

External links 
 

1963 films
Urdu-language Pakistani films
1963 musical films
1960s Urdu-language films
1960s romantic musical films
Pakistani romantic musical films
Pakistani black-and-white films
1966 musical films
Nigar Award winners